Her World is a monthly English-language magazine published in Singapore targeted at the female professionals reading market. It is also the first English-language women's magazine to be published in Singapore.

History
The magazine was published since July 1960 and was Singapore's first English-language women’s magazine. This magazine is also published in four other countries, Malaysia, Indonesia, Thailand and Vietnam. The Malaysian edition of Her World is Malaysia's first home grown women's magazine and has a different logo is different from other countries' edition. It consists of fashion pieces, advertisements targeted at female professionals, writeups on grooming, lifestyle and personal choices, amongst others. It is published by SPH Magazines, a subsidiary of SPH Media Trust. The Indonesian, Thai and Vietnamese edition of Her World had the articles in their native language.

The July 2010 issue of Her World Singapore, which is the special collector's edition, is the first issue to not have a cover girl since the first issue in July 1960 to coincide with the 50th anniversary of the magazine.

Its main rival in the market is Female, published since 1974, also owned by SPHM. The magazine is also published in Malaysia (since 1974) and Indonesia (since 2000).

In 2003, Her World was the best-selling women's magazine in Singapore with a circulation of 141,000 copies.

Link with modelling show series
The winner of Vietnam's Next Top Model from cycle 1 and 2 will have a spread and be on the cover of Her World Vietnam and will be supported by Her World International.

The winner of The Face Vietnam from cycle 3 onwards will have a spread and be on the cover of Her World Vietnam and will be supported by Her World International.

References

External links
Official website
Official Singaporean website
Official Malaysian website
Official Vietnamese website
Official Indonesian website

1960 establishments in Singapore
Monthly magazines published in Singapore
Magazines published in Indonesia
Magazines published in Malaysia
Magazines published in Singapore
Magazines published in Vietnam
Magazines established in 1960
Women's magazines
English-language magazines
SPH Media Trust
History of women in Singapore